Sliderock Lake is an alpine lake in Custer County, Idaho, United States, located in the White Cloud Mountains in the Sawtooth National Recreation Area.  The lake is named for a jumbled rock slide that extends into the lake from the south side.

Sliderock Lake is northeast of Merriam Peak and located in the lower section of the Boulder Chain Lakes Basin.  The lake is accessed from Sawtooth National Forest trail 683.

See also
Castle Peak
List of lakes of the White Cloud Mountains
Hatchet Lake
Shelf Lake
Sawtooth National Recreation Area
White Cloud Mountains

References

Lakes of Idaho
Lakes of Custer County, Idaho
Glacial lakes of the United States
Glacial lakes of the Sawtooth National Forest